"Sunshine and Summertime" is a song written by John Rich, Kylie Sackley, and Rodney Clawson and recorded by American country music singer Faith Hill.  It was released in June 2006 as the fourth single from Hill’s 2005 album Fireflies. The song reached No. 7 on the US Billboard Hot Country Songs chart.

Content
The song talks about the highlights of the Summer season, including things like, “barefoot ladies and tricked out Mercedes” to “classic colas and ice cold Coronas”.

Chart performance
"Sunshine and Summertime" was one of five singles released from Hill's highly successful return-to-roots 2005 country album, Fireflies. "Sunshine and Summertime" debuted outside the Country Top 40 in mid-2006, following the successof her previous Top 10 Country hit, "The Lucky One". The song peaked inside the Country Top 10 in Summer 2006, at No. 7. The song also charted on the Billboard Hot 100 at No. 70, but failed to chart the Pop 100 unlike her first two singles released from the album, including her No. 1, "Mississippi Girl".

"Sunshine and Summertime" was Hill's last solo Top 10 hit to date, as well as her last major hit from the album.

Personnel
Compiled from liner notes.
 Greg Barnhill — background vocals
 Bekka Bramlett — background vocals
 Tom Bukovac — electric guitar
 Paul Bushnell — bass guitar
 Dan Dugmore — banjo
 Stuart Duncan — mandolin
 Shannon Forrest — drums, percussion
 Paul Franklin — steel guitar
 Jimmy Nichols — keyboards
 Javier Solis — percussion
 Bryan Sutton — acoustic guitar

Chart performance

Year-end charts

References

2006 singles
2005 songs
Faith Hill songs
Songs written by John Rich
Songs written by Rodney Clawson
Song recordings produced by Byron Gallimore
Warner Records singles
Songs written by Kylie Sackley